Ctenotus zebrilla, also known commonly as the Southern Cape York fine-snout ctenotus, is a species of skink, a lizard in the family Scincidae. The species is endemic to Australia.

Etymology
The specific name zebrilla is Neo-Latin for "little zebra" in reference to the species' apparent black and white stripes.

Geographic range and habitat
C. zebrilla is found in the north-eastern highlands of Queensland, occupying tall, open woodland on stony hills.

Description
Dorsally, C. zebrilla is black with eight thin, white stripes along its back.

Reproduction
Like many lizards, C. zebrilla is oviparous.

References

Skinks of Australia
Reptiles of Queensland
Reptiles described in 1981
zebrilla
Taxa named by Glen Milton Storr